Abalak is a department of the Tahoua Region in Niger. Its capital is the city of Abalak. As of 2011, the department had a total population of 112,273 people.

References

External links 

Departments of Niger
Tahoua Region